The 2026 United States elections are scheduled to be held, in large part, on Tuesday, November 3, 2026. During this U.S. midterm election, which will occur during the term of the president elected in the 2024 United States presidential election, all 435 seats in the U.S. House of Representatives and 33 of the 100 seats in the U.S. Senate will be contested to determine the 120th United States Congress. Thirty-nine state and territorial U.S. gubernatorial elections, as well as numerous state and local elections, will also be contested.

Federal elections

Senate elections

House of Representatives elections

All 435 voting seats in the United States House of Representatives will be up for election. Additionally, elections will be held to select the delegate for the District of Columbia as well as the delegates from four of the five U.S. territories, excluding Puerto Rico.

State elections

Elections will be held for the governorships of 36 U.S. states and three insular areas. As most governors serve four-year terms, the last regularly scheduled elections for most seats up for election in 2026 were held in 2022. The governors of New Hampshire and Vermont each serve two-year terms, so incumbents in these two states will be determined in 2024.

Local elections

Mayoral elections
A number of major cities will hold mayoral elections in 2026.

Eligible incumbents

 Long Beach, California: One-term incumbent Rex Richardson is eligible for re-election.
 Los Angeles, California: One-term incumbent Karen Bass is eligible for re-election.
 Louisville, Kentucky: One-term incumbent Craig Greenberg is eligible for re-election.
 North Las Vegas, Nevada: One-term incumbent Pamela Goynes-Brown is eligible for re-election.
 Oakland, California: One-term incumbent Sheng Thao is eligible for re-election.
 Oklahoma City, Oklahoma: Two-term incumbent David Holt is eligible for re-election.
 Washington, D.C.: Three-term incumbent Muriel Bowser is eligible for re-election.

Ineligible or retiring incumbents
 Reno, Nevada: Three-term incumbent Hillary Schieve is term-limited and ineligible to run.

References

 
2026